Gustavus Brooks (1872 – June 15, 1895) was an American Negro league outfielder in the 1890s.

A native of Alton, Illinois, Brooks played for the Chicago Unions in 1894, and for the Page Fence Giants the following season. He collapsed in the outfield during a game in Hastings, Michigan in 1895 and died two hours later at age 23.

References

External links
Baseball statistics and player information from Baseball-Reference Black Baseball Stats and Seamheads

1872 births
1895 deaths
Date of birth missing
Chicago Unions players
Page Fence Giants players
Sports deaths in Michigan